Alexey Eduardovich Kim (born April 5, 1986) is a Soviet-born South Korean chess player. He is the only South Korean to hold the FIDE title of Grandmaster.

Biography
A third-generation ethnic Korean, Kim was born on April 5, 1986 in Tashkent, Uzbekistan, in the Soviet Union. He learned chess from his grandfather, Nikolay Vladimirovich Kim, at four years old. When he was eleven, he won the Moscow Junior Championship. Kim became a FIDE master in 2000, an international master in 2001, and a grandmaster in 2004. In 2006, he paid the required fee to FIDE (chess's international governing body) to switch his national federation to South Korea, in keeping with his grandfather's wishes. Kim played on the South Korean team in the 2008 Chess Olympiad. In 2013, he shared first place with Stanislav Novikov, Batuhan Dastan, Hagen Poetsch, Ralf Åkesson, Jonathan Hawkins and Kacper Drozdowski in the 18th Vienna Chess Open.

References

External links

Alexey Kim chess games at 365Chess.com

1986 births
Living people
Chess grandmasters
Chess Olympiad competitors
Koryo-saram
Sportspeople from Tashkent
Russian chess players
South Korean chess players